Rong Guotuan (August 10, 1937 – June 20, 1968) was a Chinese table tennis player. He won the men's singles title at the 1959 World Table Tennis Championships in Dortmund, the first world championship winner representing the People's Republic of China. During the Cultural Revolution, Rong was persecuted as a "spy suspect". He committed suicide on June 20, 1968.

Early years
Rong Guotuan was born in British Hong Kong in 1937, with family roots from Zhuhai, Guangdong Province, China. He started playing table tennis in his childhood and participated in competitions in Hong Kong as a junior. In 1957, Rong decided to move to Mainland China. He won national champion in the following year and was later selected as a member of the national team.

Playing career
Rong's participation in the World Table Tennis Championships began in Dortmund, 1959. Chinese men's team faced Hungary at the semifinals of the team competition. Rong lost to Zoltán Berczik, the 1958 European champion, in three games. He defeated Laszlo Foldy but lost to the 1953 World Championships winner Ferenc Sidó at the eighth team match. The Chinese team was defeated by Hungary, 3–5.

In men's singles competition, Rong recorded seven straight wins to clinch the men's world championship. He became the first world championship winner after the foundation of the People's Republic of China (PRC). The first table tennis ball Double Happiness (DHS) made in China for international competitions was named after Rong's victory at the Championships and the tenth anniversary of the PRC's establishment in 1959.

At the 1961 World Table Tennis Championships in Beijing, Rong helped Chinese men's team win the first team title by defeating Japan and Hungary in the finals. After 1964, he worked as the coach of Chinese women's team. The women's team won their first champion at the 1965 World Championships.

Cultural Revolution and suicide
The Cultural Revolution initiated in 1966 caused professional sportsmen to be denounced as "sprouts of revisionism" and the Chinese team were absent from the 1967 World Championships. Rong Guotuan and other members of the national team, Fu Qifang and Jiang Yongning, were placed under house arrest by Red Guards. They were each condemned on trumped-up charges of spying and subjected to torture and public humiliation. Fu and Jiang committed suicide after sustained periods of detention and torture in 1968. Rong hanged himself on June 20 in the same year.  His suicide note read, "I am not a spy; please do not suspect me. I have let you down. I treasure my reputation more than my life."

In 1978, the State Physical Culture and Sports Commission rehabilitated Rong Guotuan's honor. In 1987, a bronze statue of Rong was built in his ancestral home, Zhuhai.

See also
List of table tennis players

References

1937 births
1968 deaths
Chinese male table tennis players
Hong Kong male table tennis players
Suicides during the Cultural Revolution
World Table Tennis Championships medalists
Suicides by hanging in China